"Little Saint Nick" is a song by American rock band the Beach Boys first released as a single on December 9, 1963. Written by Brian Wilson and Mike Love, the Christmas song applies hot-rod themes to Santa Claus and his sleigh.

The single peaked at number 3 on Billboard magazine's special seasonal weekly Christmas Singles chart. Its B-side was an a cappella version of "The Lord's Prayer". In November 1964, an alternate mix of "Little Saint Nick" appeared as the opening track on The Beach Boys' Christmas Album.

Background

"Little Saint Nick" was recorded on October 20, 1963, at Western Studio in Hollywood. The idea for the song was partly inspired by record producer Phil Spector's plans to record a Christmas album. Wilson recalled: "I wrote the lyrics to it while I was out on a date and then I rushed home to finish the music." Some of its rhythm and structure derives from the group's "Little Deuce Coupe", also co-written by Wilson and released as a single six months earlier. Love was not originally listed as the co-writer of "Little Saint Nick". His credit was awarded after a 1990s lawsuit.

Variations

"Little Saint Nick" reappeared on The Beach Boys' Christmas Album in 1964, with the stereo pressings of the album containing a new mix that removes the overdubbed sleigh bells, celeste and glockenspiel. This was done so that it would fit better with the sound of the album's first side, which was recorded in a hurry with basic instrumentation. Another version of the song, utilizing the melody and backing track later used for the All Summer Long song "Drive-In", was recorded during the album sessions in June 1964, but remained unreleased until a 1991 CD reissue.

Charts

Certifications

Notes

Songs about Santa Claus
1963 singles
1910 Fruitgum Company songs
Capitol Records singles
American Christmas songs
She & Him songs
Sugar Ray songs
The Beach Boys songs
Song recordings produced by Brian Wilson
Songs written by Brian Wilson
Songs written by Mike Love
1963 songs
Christmas novelty songs